The 1948 Soviet Chess Championship was the 16th edition of USSR Chess Championship. Held from 10 November to 13 December 1948 in Moscow. The tournament was won by David Bronstein and Alexander Kotov. Mikhail Botvinnik did not participate in the championship again, as he had recently won the world title in the tournament at The Hague and Moscow. In fact he was to take a three-year break, to
work on his doctorate. Quarterfinal tournaments were played in the cities of Tbilisi and Yaroslavl; and semifinals in Sverdlovsk, Leningrad and Moscow.

Table and results

References 

USSR Chess Championships
Championship
Chess
1948 in chess
Chess